The 2018 Ligue 1 is the 51st season of Ligue 1, the top professional league for association football clubs in the Republic of the Congo, since its establishment in 1961. The season started on 27 January 2018 and concluded on 21 October 2018.

Final standings

See also
2018 Coupe du Congo

References

2018 in the Republic of the Congo sport
Football competitions in the Republic of the Congo
Congo Republic